{{Infobox
| bodystyle  = width:20em;
| abovestyle = background:inherit; font-weight:bold;
| labelstyle = background:inherit; white-space:nowrap;
| above      = <small>Harry Potter books</small>Hogwarts: An Incomplete and Unreliable Guide
| image      = 
| caption    = 
| label1     = Author
| data1      = J. K. Rowling
| label2     = Illustrator
| data2      = 
| label3     = Genre
| data3      = Fantasy
| label4     = Auction date
| data4      =  
| label5     = Price
| data5      = £2.99 / US$3 / €2.99 
| label6     = Publisher
| data6      = 
| label7     = Publication date
| data7      = 6 September 2016
| label8     = Pages
| data8      = 84
}}Hogwarts: An Incomplete and Unreliable Guide is an e-book written by J. K. Rowling, a guide to Hogwarts and its secrets. It was released on 6 September 2016 in several languages at the same time.

Publication history
This book was released at the same time as two others: 
 Short Stories from Hogwarts of Power, Politics and Pesky Poltergeists
 Short Stories from Hogwarts of Heroism, Hardship and Dangerous Hobbies

Content
In this guide, we find information about Hogwarts, Platform 9 3/4 and The Sorting Hat.

References

Books by J. K. Rowling
Collections of fairy tales
2016 books
Wizarding World books